Lauren Anna Lee (born 12 February 2004) is an American-born female taekwondo practitioner who has competed for Haiti.

Career
A native of Maple Grove, Minnesota, Lee is the granddaughter of Grandmaster Byung Yul Lee, who helped bring the sport to the United States in 1969. After Florida-born Aliyah Shipman, who had won a spot for the 2020 Olympics in the Pan American qualifiers, was blocked from competing by the United States Olympic & Paralympic Committee, Lee was selected to replace her. In her first match, in the Round of 16, she lost to the eventual champion Matea Jelić. Since Jelić reached the final, Lee entered the repechage, where she was eliminated in the first match by Milena Titoneli.

References

External links
 

2004 births
Living people
Taekwondo practitioners at the 2020 Summer Olympics
Olympic taekwondo practitioners of Haiti
People from Maple Grove, Minnesota
Haitian female taekwondo practitioners
American female taekwondo practitioners
21st-century American women